The Texas Zephyr was a named passenger train operated by the Colorado & Southern Railway and the Fort Worth & Denver Railway (both subsidiaries of the Chicago, Burlington & Quincy Railroad). The train was originally designated number 1 southbound, and number 2 northbound. 

Inaugurated on August 22, 1940, the streamlined train ran from Denver, Colorado's Union Station to Fort Worth and Dallas, Texas, replacing the heavyweight Colorado Special.  At Dallas, the Texas Zephyr connected with the Sam Houston Zephyr and Texas Rocket, both operating on the jointly owned Burlington-Rock Island Railroad for through service to Houston. 

Initially, the train was equipped with Budd-built streamlined stainless steel chair cars and an observation dining-lounge car.  Sleeping cars were, however, rebuilt streamlined heavyweight cars.  The train was pulled between Denver and Fort Worth by pairs of General Motors Electro-Motive Division stainless steel E5 diesels.  To allow adequate time for servicing the diesel locomotives in Fort Worth, a FW&D 550 class 4-6-2 "Pacific" type steam locomotive shuttled the train between Fort Worth and Dallas.  It was later replaced by sister E5 diesel locomotives purchased by the C&S from parent CB&Q.

In 1957, the re-equipping of the 1936 Denver Zephyr made those trainsets available, and they were assigned to the Texas Zephyr.  Though older than the original Texas Zephyr equipment, they offered more luxurious amenities.  These consists ran on the Texas Zephyr until February 1965, when they were retired and the original equipment restored to the train, albeit with Pullman pool streamlined cars or sleeping cars from the parent CB&Q.

As a result of it losing its U.S. Mail railway post contract, the Fort Worth & Denver abandoned all passenger service in 1967, the Texas Zephyr making its last run on September 11 of that year.

Major stops
Denver
Colorado Springs
Pueblo
Trinidad
Amarillo
Wichita Falls
Fort Worth
Dallas

References

External links

Burlington Route Historical Society, "The Burlington Zephyrs" (includes map of the various Zephyr routes) 
Dallas Railroad Museum, "A Brief History of Railroads in Dallas"
Goen, Steve Allen, Fort Worth and Denver Color Pictorial, Four Ways West Publications, 1996.  .
Goen, Steve Allen, "Zephyr a Star in Wichita's Crown," 1999 newspaper article about the history of the Texas Zephyr, published by the Wichita Falls, Texas, Times Record News 
Ken's Weather and Railroad page (photos and timetable of the 1959 Texas Zephyr) 
"Southwestern Hospitality," Time August 26, 1940 (article about a railroad controversy affecting the welcoming of the new Texas Zephyr to Texas) 
Streamliner Schedules (timetable and consist of the 1941 Texas Zephyr, based on entry in ''Official Guide of the Railways') 

Named passenger trains of the United States
Passenger trains of the Chicago, Burlington and Quincy Railroad
Passenger rail transportation in Colorado
Passenger rail transportation in New Mexico
Passenger rail transportation in Texas
Railway services introduced in 1940
North American streamliner trains
Night trains of the United States
Railway services discontinued in 1967